Pterolophia bispinosa is a species of beetle in the family Cerambycidae. It was described by Stephan von Breuning in 1938. It is known from Australian.

References

bispinosa
Beetles described in 1938